The Essential Herbie Hancock is the forty-sixth album by American jazz musician and pianist Herbie Hancock. It is part of Sony BMG's The Essential series.  Unlike the box set The Herbie Hancock Box, this 2-disc set is the first compilation of Hancock's music that included music from all the various recording labels for which Hancock recorded.

Track listing

Disc one

Disc two

References

Herbie Hancock compilation albums
2006 greatest hits albums
Columbia Records compilation albums